Pulo Aceh is a district of Aceh Besar Regency, Indonesia. It comprises a number of islands off the north-western tip of Sumatra, of which the largest are Pulau Breuh, Pulau Nasi and Pulau Teunom. It covers a land area of 90.56 km2 and had a population of 3,796 at the 2010 Census and 4,463 at the 2020 Census. The district encompasses 17 villages (gampong) and has a post code of 23991.

Reference

Aceh Besar Regency